The Jordan 195 was the Formula One car with which the Jordan team competed in the 1995 Formula One World Championship. The number 14 car was driven by Brazilian Rubens Barrichello and the number 15 car by Northern Irishman Eddie Irvine. The car was powered by the 3-litre Peugeot A10 V10 engine and ran on Total fuel. Total also served as the team's main sponsor for the season.

The 195 featured a distinctive low nose and highly sculpted sidepods, lending it a very smooth appearance despite the mixed-up colour scheme. It achieved Jordan's then best-ever result at the Canadian Grand Prix, when Barrichello and Irvine finished second and third respectively behind Jean Alesi's Ferrari. However, the car was not consistently competitive and suffered numerous reliability problems, and the team ended up in sixth place in the Constructors' Championship.

Complete Formula One results
(key) (results in bold indicate pole position)

References

External links

1995 Formula One season cars
Jordan Formula One cars